Mwale Medical and Technology City (commonly abbreviated as MMTC) is a community-owned sustainable metropolis located in Butere Sub-county, Kakamega, Kenya. It is centered around a large medical complex with a 5,000-patient capacity Hamptons Hospital, with a research and innovation park in the Plaza district. It also has a large industrial district anchored by a solar power plant. Three other districts have residential homes with a 36-hole golf course, a commercial shopping center with mall, supermarkets, and hotels, and an airport district for evacuating patients to the hospital via a planned cable car. The city cost US$2 billion. It is "a golden standard for new green Cities' development worldwide." MMTC serves as a successful template for other new cities due to the way it has integrated and uplifted the local community and catalyzed economic growth in the region.

History 
A feasibility study carried out from 2007 to 2012 established the site of a proposed medical tourism and technology city in western Kenya. The lead investor Julius Mwale, a Kenyan technology entrepreneur and investor based in the US, assembled a team of technology and healthcare experts and companies from the US and enlisted them for phase one of the city which commenced in 2014 and was completed in 2016.

Phase 1 began in 2014 and encompassed a multi-billion shopping and residential complex, Hamptons Mall, with Mwal-mart Supermarket as the anchor. The mall hosts Mwal-mart Supermarket, Hamptons Cafe bed and breakfast, a showroom, and more than 90,000 square feet of private residences. Phase two commenced in June 2016 and ran to September 2017. This included the first section of 5,000 bed referral hospital, over 70 kilometers of roads, and more than 300 solar street lights. Phase 2 also included the first phase of 4,800 homes expected to host doctors and nurses. The final phase, from September 2017 to December 2020 and beyond, has the 36-hole golf resort and residences, an airport with the second shopping mall, a convention center and a water park connected to the hospital by a cable car. It will also have a medical school, a technology park and a 144-megawatt gasification power plant. The project cost is estimated at US$2 billion.

Since its initiation, MMTC has received widespread admiration from a majority of both local and foreign visitors who have toured the project. The project's success has been attributed to its model of reaching out to locals (the Marama clan of the Luhya) within the project perimeter and establishing key contacts and relationships. This has seen most of them donate huge tracts of ancestral land to the project to benefit them and MMTC. In this scenario, their lives have been positively impacted since the poor families are blessed with newly constructed homes as well several rental units which act as residences for the ever-increasing number of project workers. MMTC has also created employment for over 1000 youths in the area. In return, the project has received key backing from these local stakeholders; a factor that is said to have significantly contributed in resisting the failed attempts by a few politicians and officials of the Kakamega County Government, who had hatched a plot to taint the image of the project and also suspend its construction due to unexplained approval issues. In August 2018, the Kakamega County Government, led by Governor Wycliffe Oparanya, agreed with the lead investor, Julius Mwale, to set aside past grievances and thus facilitate the timely completion of this community-backed project.

Climate 

MMTC is situated in a tropical rainforest climate. The area enjoys stable year-round temperatures averaging 20.8 °C (69.4 °F) and ranging from average lows of 19.7 °C (67.4 °F) in the coolest month of July to average highs of 29.4 °C (84.8 °F) in the warmest month of February. Mornings are typically cooler and afternoons warmer, but the temperature rarely ever rises above 31.7 °C (89 °F) or drops below 12.8 °C (55 °F) 

Humidity is 56-79% year-round, generally below 69% from December through March and above 72% from April to November.

There is frequent rainfall, with an average as low as 77 mm (3.0 inches) in the driest month of February and as high as 244 mm (9.6 inches) in the wettest month of April. The best times to visit are late June to early October and from late November to early March.

Economy 

At the center of the local economy is Hamptons Hospital, which welcomes patients for the treatment of cancer and other ailments. MMTC also contains a multi-billion shilling shopping and residential complex. The city is built using renewable sources of energy including thousands of solar powered street lights and a solar power plant that is expanding to 50 MW. A 36-hole golf resort and residences contains 1,500 rooms, 4,800 residences along the golf course. Other amenities include a planned water park, a convention center and a second large mall built at the airport. Thousands of workers are employed in the city making it one of the largest employers in the region.

Plaza District 

The Plaza district is one of the five economic centers of Mwale Medical and Technology City. The district is anchored by the 5,000 patient capacity Hamptons hospital, the innovation park, and commercial centers with shopping, dining, hospitality and residential homes.

Hamptons Hospital 
Hamptons hospital acquired Kshs. 21 billion (US$200 million) equipment in 2021 that enabled it to become one of the world's leading hospitals.

It was opened in July 2019 with cancer treatment and subsequently opened other departments. The hospital provides free treatment to the 2 million residents of Kakamega County with National hospital Insurance Fund (NHIF)cards. It is NHIF accredited.

Ambulatory services were launched to provide emergency care to residents in the western region of Kenya. The hospital supports the community in other ways other than providing treatment.

It distributes free solar street lights to schools and the entire county. One billion shillings (US$10 million) have been spent on a community lighting program in Kakamega County.

The hospital is the western region reference center for Covid 19 treatment. It is expanding its services to cover the entire Lake Victoria region with the introduction of a Hamptons floating hospital expected to serve an additional 32 million residents living along the shores of Lake Victoria.

Research and Innovation park 

The research and innovation park is based at the Plaza district and is welcoming a Sh28 billion ( $260 million ) data center by the French firm Atos. As the Research Park grows, several other major international firms have already taken space and chosen MMTC as their African headquarters.

Hamptons Mall and Residences 

Hamptons mall is a multi-billion shilling shopping mall anchored by Mwal-mart supermarket which provides a ready market for the 35,000 residents in the City, to supply their organic produce and for shopping. The mall also contains Hamptons Cafe bed and breakfast and more than 90,000 square feet of private residences; that contain gymnasium and olympic size swimming pool for private residents. These were part of phase 1 of the City construction from 2014 to 2016

Industrial District 

The industrial district is one of the 5 economic centers of MMTC, and is anchored by a solar power plant. The district runs for 4 Kilometers and has its main two arterial roads; the Power plant road and By-pass road connected by the boulevard.
With its emphasis on sustainable development, MMTC has attracted globally-leading technology companies and hundreds of international investors. One such firm is the Miami-based Innova Eco Building System which invested US$40 million in 2019 to build a green eco panels manufacturing plant at MMTC for building the 4800 homes, most of which have already been purchased pre-construction by investors from the US and elsewhere.

These homes, like all facilities in the city, will be powered using 100% renewable energy such as solar. Atlanta-based MCX Environmental Energy Corp has invested US$100 million to build a 30-megawatt solar power plant right in the city, to complement the city's other renewable energy solutions. MMTC's solar power plant came online in 2021.

Golf District 

The golf district is the main residential district of MMTC. It consists of the 36 hole beautifully landscaped Hamptons golf course. The district mainly runs along the 9 Kilometer Golf and Church roads, beginning South at Lunza Boys Secondary School, then crossing Hamptons Boulevard to the north and veers North west past School Road at St. Michael School Muluwa. The district then bears West to 12th street at the 35th hole fairway.
A majority of the residents in this district are locals who had their homes upgraded in exchange of land. They additionally received rental homes which are rented to MMTC workers. The main economic activity in the golf district is golf tourism, farming and real estate.

Grid District 

The Grid district runs along the boulevard for 6 kilometers starting at the first street and continues past the 12th street. The district is zoned for low density housing and unlike the Plaza district, it does not contain high-rise buildings. It runs from East to the West of the City and is situated on beautiful rolling hills  with three rivers of Ingoye, Indechesa and Imbanda. the boulevard is lined with large beautiful mansions for residents.

Airport District 

The airport district is one of the five economic centers of MMTC. It runs on four main arteries with the terminal section next to the School road near  Khushibiriri. School road runs for 6 kilometers from South to North East. The 5 kilometer Station road has a ramp for the planned cable car station that is designed to ferry visitors and medical tourists from airport to the hospital at Plaza district. Third golf trail is an entertainment zone for tourists and 4th street is the main residential zone of the airport district. The 4th street contains high-rise apartments for residents and City workers.

References

External links
 Mwale Medical and Technology City (Official Page)

Science and technology in Kenya
Kakamega County
Populated places in Western Province (Kenya)
Kakamega